Lignereux can refer to:

Business 
Lignereux, a Paris and London-based French maison specialising in the making of art objects

People 
Martin-Eloy Lignereux, founder of maison Lignereux